Dilasag, officially the Municipality of Dilasag (Tagalog/Kasiguranin: Bayan ng Dilasag), is a 3rd class municipality in the province of Aurora, Philippines. According to the 2020 census, it has a population of 17,102 people.

History

The name "Dilasag" can be divided into two syllables. The prefix "Di" in the Native Language means "abundance", added to the word "lasag" which means "meat". The coined word "Dilasag", however, does not only mean abundance of meat in the place, but also refers to the over sufficient supply of forest products, marine products and minerals.

In early 1924, a group of Ilocano settlers from the Province of Tarlac arrived in Casiguran, which is now the adjacent Town of Dilasag, which were then part of Nueva Vizcaya. Finding the natives unfriendly to them, these new settlers ventured to move along the coastline going north and settled finally to what is now called Dilasag.  The place was considered habitable, because the Native Dumagats in the place were friendly. Later, more families came, making the place a community. This community was soon recognized by the Local Chief Executive of Casiguran, formerly a municipality of the Province of Quezon. It was declared a sitio of barangay Culat and eventually a barrio of Casiguran in consideration of its rapid progress and development. In 1959, Quezon 1st District Representative Manuel Enverga introduced House Bill No. 2863 in the House of Representatives, resulting to the approval of Republic Act No. 2452 on June 21, 1959, making Dilasag a municipal district, separating it from Casiguran. It was then part of the province of Quezon under the sub-province of Aurora until the latter became a province of its own in 1979.

Geography
According to the Philippine Statistics Authority, the municipality has a land area of  constituting  of the  total area of Aurora.

Barangays
Dilasag is politically subdivided into 11 barangays.

Climate

Demographics

In the 2020 census, Dilasag had a population of 17,102.

Economy

Tourism
Coastal areas of Dilasag feature white sand beaches and fresh sea foods. With its mountainous terrain, Dilasag also provides an ideal venue for trekking and mountain-climbing.

 Canawer Beach
 Parang Hills
 Diniog Beach
 Mangrove Forest Park
 Singep Falls

The municipality is also home to the Amro River Protected Landscape.

References

External links
[ Philippine Standard Geographic Code]
Dilasag on Aurora.ph

Municipalities of Aurora (province)